"Songbird" is a song by English rock band Oasis, from their fifth studio album Heathen Chemistry, and is the first single by Oasis written by vocalist Liam Gallagher. Released on 3 February 2003, the song reached number three on the UK Singles Chart, number two on the Canadian Singles Chart, and the top 10 in Ireland and Italy. During an interview with The Matt Morgan Podcast, Liam's brother and bandmate Noel Gallagher called the track a "perfect" song.

Composition
Liam has said of the song: "I like beautiful things . . . It's not all dark in Liam World. I take me shades off every now and again and have a look at the world and see some nice things." Noel Gallagher stated jokingly in an interview with Patrick Kielty that Liam decided to "write a song about his bird", and states the title "Song . . . bird" in a cave man like manner. The song was written as a tribute to then-fiancée Nicole Appleton. "Songbird" was composed in the key of G major using common time at 132 beats per minute.

Release and other versions
The song was released as the fourth single from the band's Heathen Chemistry album, on 3 February 2003 and peaked at number three on the UK Singles Chart. It is included on the band's compilation album Stop the Clocks. Being written by lead singer Liam Gallagher, it was the first time the band had released a single not written by his brother Noel. "(You've Got) The Heart of the Star" and "Columbia" are B-sides, the latter of which was recorded live at the Glasgow Barrowlands, in October 2001.

The demo of the song is a typical Oasis approach to the song, featuring overdriven guitar and a stronger beat, as well as a guitar solo. Courtney Love has said that she and Liam played a version with her whistling and Gallagher playing guitar and singing, this was noted in the book Kurt and Courtney: Talking. Gallagher played the song for UK Radio Aid in January 2005.

In December 2017, Irish music school The Music Yard used the song's melody for their Christmas song "Talking to a Snowman".

Critical reception
Doug Levy for CMJ New Music Report said that Gallagher had a "surprising talent for songwriting", referring to "Songbird" and album tracks "Better Man" and "Born on a Different Cloud". Spin magazine's Chuck Klosterman said "Songbird" was one of the two "most compelling songs" on the album.

Music video
The video features Liam performing the song in Hyde Park in London, whilst playing an acoustic guitar under a tree, and alternately chasing and being chased by a dog. The video also has an appearance by Appleton.

Track listings

 7-inch single 
A. "Songbird"
B. "(You've Got) The Heart of a Star"

 UK CD and 12-inch single 
 "Songbird"
 "(You've Got) The Heart of a Star"
 "Columbia" (live)

 UK DVD single 
 "Songbird"
 "Songbird" (demo)
 Exclusive interview and live performance footage

 Japanese maxi-single 
 "Songbird"
 "Songbird" (demo)
 "Columbia" (live)

Charts

Weekly charts

Year-end charts

Certifications

References

External links
 'Songbird' song of the day on thishereboogie.com 18 September 2008

2003 singles
Epic Records singles
Number-one singles in Scotland
Oasis (band) songs
Song recordings produced by Andy Bell (musician)
Song recordings produced by Gem Archer
Song recordings produced by Liam Gallagher
Song recordings produced by Noel Gallagher
Songs written by Liam Gallagher